Mantis, in comics, may refer to:

 Mantis (DC Comics), a supervillain in Jack Kirby's Fourth World
 Mantis (Marvel Comics), a former member of the Avengers and current member of the Guardians of the Galaxy.

See also
Mantis (disambiguation)
M.A.N.T.I.S., a superhero from an eponymous television series